Staphidine is a bis-diterpene alkaloid of the atisane type, found in the tissues of Delphinium staphisagria in the larkspur family (Ranunculaceae) along with staphimine and staphinine. Similar alkaloids are found in the genus Aconitum in that family, as well as Spiraea in the Rosaceae family.

References

Alkaloids
Heterocyclic compounds with 7 or more rings
Spiro compounds
Nitrogen heterocycles
Oxygen heterocycles